Haneed , also known as hanida is a slow-roasted lamb dish from Yemen, It is also a shared dish in places like Oman, Saudi Arabia, Bahrain and parts of Somalia and Ethiopia. It is very popular in Yemeni restaurants around the world. It is also similar to mandi, but haneed is cooked in a tannour oven and has a different spice rub.  Haneed is usually served on a plate of rice.

Preparation
Haneed is prepared by dry-rubbing chunks of bone-in lamb with a spice rub, which is then cooked in the oven for six hours on a very low temperature. This ensures that the meat is succulent and tender.

References

Yemeni cuisine
Rice dishes
Lamb dishes